Stimulant psychosis is a mental disorder characterized by psychotic symptoms (such as hallucinations, paranoid ideation, delusions, disorganized thinking, grossly disorganized behaviour) which involves and typically occurs following an overdose or several day 'binge' on psychostimulants; however, it has also been reported to occur in approximately 0.1% of individuals, within the first several weeks after starting amphetamine or methylphenidate therapy. Methamphetamine psychosis, or long-term effects of stimulant use in the brain (at the molecular level), depend upon genetics and may persist for some time.

The most common causative agents are substituted amphetamines, including substituted cathinones, as well as certain dopamine reuptake inhibitors such as cocaine and phenidates.

Signs and symptoms
The symptoms of stimulant psychosis vary depending on the drug ingested, but generally involve the symptoms of organic psychosis such as hallucinations, delusions, or paranoia. Other symptoms may include mania, erratic behavior, agitation and/or aggression.

Cause

Substituted amphetamines

Drugs in the class of amphetamines, or substituted amphetamines, are known to induce "amphetamine psychosis" typically when chronically abused or used in high doses. In an Australian study of 309 active methamphetamine users, 18% had experienced a clinical level psychosis in the past year. Commonly abused amphetamines include methamphetamine, MDMA, 4-FA, as well as substituted cathinones like a-PVP, MDPV, and mephedrone, though a large number of other closely related compounds have been recently synthesized. Methylphenidate is sometimes incorrectly included in this class, although it is nonetheless still capable of producing stimulant psychosis.

The symptoms of amphetamine psychosis include auditory and visual hallucinations, grandiosity, delusions of persecution, and delusions of reference concurrent with both clear consciousness and prominent extreme agitation. A Japanese study of recovery from methamphetamine psychosis reported a 64% recovery rate within 10 days rising to an 82% recovery rate at 30 days after methamphetamine cessation. However it has been suggested that around 5–15% of users fail to make a complete recovery in the long term. Furthermore, even at a small dose, the psychosis can be quickly reestablished. Psychosocial stress has been found to be an independent risk factor for psychosis relapse even without further substituted amphetamine use in certain cases.

The symptoms of acute amphetamine psychosis are very similar to those of the acute phase of schizophrenia although in amphetamine psychosis visual hallucinations are more common and thought disorder is rare. Amphetamine psychosis may be purely related to high drug usage, or high drug usage may trigger an underlying vulnerability to schizophrenia. There is some evidence that vulnerability to amphetamine psychosis and schizophrenia may be genetically related. Relatives of methamphetamine users with a history of amphetamine psychosis are five times more likely to have been diagnosed with schizophrenia than relatives of methamphetamine users without a history of amphetamine psychosis. The disorders are often distinguished by a rapid resolution of symptoms in amphetamine psychosis, while schizophrenia is more likely to follow a chronic course.

Although rare and not formally recognized, a condition known as Amphetamine Withdrawal Psychosis (AWP) may occur upon cessation of substituted amphetamine use and, as the name implies, involves psychosis that appears on withdrawal from substituted amphetamines.  However, unlike similar disorders, in AWP, substituted amphetamines reduce rather than increase symptoms, and the psychosis or mania resolves with resumption of the previous dosing schedule.

Cocaine
Cocaine has a similar potential to induce temporary psychosis with more than half of cocaine abusers reporting at least some psychotic symptoms at some point. Typical symptoms include paranoid delusions that they are being followed and that their drug use is being watched, accompanied by hallucinations that support the delusional beliefs. Delusional parasitosis with formication ("cocaine bugs") is also a fairly common symptom.

Cocaine-induced psychosis shows sensitization toward the psychotic effects of the drug. This means that psychosis becomes more severe with repeated intermittent use.

Phenidates

Methylphenidate and its analogues (such as ethylphenidate, 4F-MPH, and isopropylphenidate) share similar pharmacological profiles as other norepinephrine-dopamine reuptake inhibitors. Chronic abuse of methylphenidate has the potential to lead to psychosis. Similar psychiatric side effects have been reported in a study of ethylphenidate. No studies regarding psychosis and 4F-MPH or isopropylphenidate have been conducted, but given their high DAT binding and cellular uptake activity, the possibility of stimulant psychosis remains.

Caffeine
There is limited evidence that caffeine, in high doses or when chronically abused, may induce psychosis in normal individuals and worsen pre-existing psychosis in those diagnosed with schizophrenia.

Diagnosis

Differential diagnosis
Though less common than stimulant psychosis, stimulants such as cocaine and amphetamines as well as the dissociative drug phencyclidine (PCP, angel dust) may also cause a theorized severe and life-threatening condition known as excited delirium.  This condition manifests as a combination of delirium, psychomotor agitation, anxiety, delusions, hallucinations, speech disturbances, disorientation, violent and bizarre behavior, insensitivity to pain, elevated body temperature, and hysterical strength.  Despite some superficial similarities in presentation excited delirium is a distinct (and more serious) condition than stimulant psychosis.  The existence of excited delirium is currently debated.

Transition to schizophrenia
A 2019 systematic review and meta-analysis by Murrie et al. found that the pooled proportion of transition from amphetamine-induced psychosis to schizophrenia was 22% (5 studies, CI 14%–34%). This was lower than cannabis (34%) and hallucinogens (26%), but higher than opioid (12%), alcohol (10%) and sedative (9%) induced psychoses. Transition rates were slightly lower in older cohorts but were not affected by sex, country of the study, hospital or community location, urban or rural setting, diagnostic methods, or duration of follow-up.

Treatment
Treatment consists of supportive care during the acute intoxication phase: maintaining hydration, body temperature, blood pressure, and heart rate at acceptable levels until the drug is sufficiently metabolized to allow vital signs to return to baseline. Typical and atypical antipsychotics have been shown to be helpful in the early stages of treatment. However, the benzodiazepines, temazepam and triazolam at 30 mg and 0.5 mg, respectively, are highly effective if aggression, agitation, or violent behaviour is apparent. In the instance of persistent psychosis after repeated use of stimulants, there are cases in which electroconvulsive therapy has been beneficial. This is followed by abstinence from psychostimulants supported with counselling or medication designed to assist the individual preventing a relapse and the resumption of a psychotic state.

See also

 Aimo Koivunen
 Amphetamine
 Delusional parasitosis
 Dopamine hypothesis of psychosis
 Excited delirium
 Psychosis
 Substance-induced psychosis
 Neuroleptic malignant syndrome

References

External links 

Psychosis
Biology of bipolar disorder
Amphetamine